Ronnie Nunn (born in Brooklyn, New York) is a former professional basketball referee in the National Basketball Association (NBA) for nineteen seasons and served for five years as the league's Director of Officials, until being reassigned in 2008 in the wake of the Tim Donaghy scandal.  More recently he was host of Making the Call With Ronnie Nunn for seven seasons on NBA TV.  He officiated 1,134 regular season, 73 playoff, four NBA Finals games, and the 1996 NBA All-Star Game.

Early life
Nunn attended Brooklyn Technical High School where he was an All City Basketball player and Honorable Mention Baseball player and later attended George Washington University. He was inducted into the GWU Basketball Hall of Fame as well as being part of GWU's Basketball's All Century Team   After college, he played two seasons of professional basketball for Leon of the Circuito Nacional de basket Mexico and named by the Mexico press as the North American player of the decade during the 70's. He was a member of two NBA team camps, the New York Knicks and New Jersey Nets and a member of the ABA Denver Rockets Camp. Nunn became a ten-year Special Education Teacher and Administrator and later became a Pace University Assistant Basketball Coach from 1978 to 1982 before being appointed to the NBA Officiating staff in 1984.

References

Year of birth missing (living people)
Living people
Sportspeople from Brooklyn
George Washington University alumni
National Basketball Association referees
Brooklyn Technical High School alumni
George Washington Colonials men's basketball players